Upper Belvedere may refer to:

 Upper Belvedere, an area in Belvedere, London
 Upper Belvedere, one of the two palaces that form the Belvedere, Vienna